The use of vine training systems in viticulture is aimed primarily to assist in canopy management with finding the balance in enough foliage to facilitate photosynthesis without excessive shading that could impede grape ripening or promote grape diseases. Additional benefits of utilizing particular training systems could be to control potential yields and to facilitate mechanization of certain vineyard tasks such as pruning, irrigation, applying pesticide or fertilizing sprays as well as harvesting the grapes. 

In deciding on what type of vine training system to use, growers also consider the climate conditions of the vineyard where the amount of sunlight, humidity and wind could have a large impact on the exact benefits the training system offers. For instance, while having a large spread out canopy (such as what the Geneva Double Curtain offers) can promote a favorable leaf to fruit ratio for photosynthesis, it offers very little wind protection. In places such as the Châteauneuf-du-Pape, strong prevailing winds called le mistral can take the fruit right off the vine so a more condensed, protective vine training system is desirable for vineyards there.

While closely related, the terms trellising, pruning and vine training are often used interchangeably even though they refer to different things. Technically speaking, the trellis refers to the actual stakes, posts, wires or other structures that the grapevine is attached to. Some vines are allowed to grow free standing without any attachment to a trellising structure. Part of the confusion between trellising and vine training systems stems from the fact that vine training systems will often take on the name of the particular type of trellising involved.  Pruning refers to the cutting and shaping of the cordon or "arms" of the grapevine in winter which will determine the number of buds that are allowed to become grape clusters. In some wine regions, such as France, the exact number of buds is outlined by Appellation d'origine contrôlée (AOC) regulations. During the summer growing season, pruning can involve removing young plant shoots or excess bunches of grapes with green harvesting. Vine training systems utilize the practice of trellising and pruning in order to dictate and control a grape vine's canopy which will influence the potential yield of that year's crop as well as the quality of the grapes due to the access of air and sunlight needed for the grapes to ripen fully and for preventing various grape diseases.

History

As one of the world's oldest cultivated crops, grapevines have been trained for several millennia. Cultures such as the ancient Egyptians and Phoenicians discovered that different training techniques could promote more abundant and fruitful yields. When the Greeks began to colonize southern Italy in the 8th century BC, they called the land Oenotria which could be interpreted as "staked" or land of staked vines. In the 1st century AD, Roman writers such as Columella and Pliny the Elder gave advice to vineyard owners about what type of vine trainings worked well for certain vineyards.

Historically, regional tradition largely dictated what type of vine training would be found in a given area. In the early 20th century, many of these traditions were codified into specific wine laws and regulations such as the French AOC system. The widespread study and utilization of various training systems began in the 1960s when many New World wine regions were developing their wine industry. Without the centuries of tradition that influenced Old World winemaking and viticulture, vine growers in areas like California, Washington, Australia and New Zealand conducted large scale research into how particular vine training systems, pruning and canopy management techniques impacted wine quality. As research in this area continued into the 21st century, new vine training systems were developed that could be adapted to the desired wine making style as well as the labor needs and particular mesoclimate of the vineyard.

Purpose

While the most pertinent purpose of establishing a vine training system is canopy management, especially dealing with shading, there are many other reasons that come into play. As members of the Vitis family, grapevines are climbing plants that do not have their own natural support like trees. While grapevines have woody trunks, the weight of a vine's leafy canopy and grape clusters will often bring the vine's cordons or "arms" down towards the ground unless it receives some form of support. 

In viticulture, growers want to avoid any part of the cordon from touching the ground because of the vine's natural inclination to send out suckers or basal shoots and take root in that area where the cordon is touching the ground. Ever since the phylloxera epidemic of the 19th century, many vines are grafted on phylloxera-resistant rootstock. However, the "top part" of the grafted vine is still very susceptible to the phylloxera, and should a part of that vine take root both the daughter and the original mother vine will risk being infected by the louse. Additionally this daughter vine will leech resources of water and nutrients from the mother vine which can diminish the quality of both vines' grape production.

Other reasons for vine training involve setting up the vineyard and each individual vine canopy for more efficient labor usage or mechanization. Vines that are trained to have their "fruiting zone" of grape clusters at waist to chest height are easier for vineyard workers to harvest without straining their bodies with excessive bending or reaching. Similarly, keeping the fruiting zone in a consistent spot on each vine makes it easier to set up machinery for pruning, spraying and harvesting.

The impact of excessive shading
Many vine training systems are designed to avoid excessive shading of the fruit by the leafy growth (the "canopy"). While some shading is beneficial, especially in very hot and sunny climates, to prevent heat stress, excessive amounts of shading can have negative impact on grape development. As a photosynthetic plant, grapevines need access to sunlight in order to complete their physiological processes. Through photosynthesis, less than 10% of the full sunlight received by a leaf is converted into energy which makes obstacles such as shading even more detrimental to the plant. Even if the leaves at the top of the canopy are receiving plenty of sunlight, the young buds, grape clusters and leaves below will still experience some negative impact. During the annual growth cycle of the grapevine, excessive shading can reduce the success rate of bud formation, budbreak, fruit set as well as the size and quantity of grape berries on a cluster.

The grape clusters receive some benefit from receiving direct sunlight through enhanced ripening of various phenolic compounds that can contribute to a wine's aroma and quality. In addition to having decreased physiological ripeness, excessive shade will negatively impact a grape's quality by causing increases in the levels of potassium, malic acid and pH in the grapes while decreasing the amount of sugar, tartaric acid and color producing anthocyanins. Beyond a lack of sunlight, excessive shading limits the amount of air circulation that can take place within a vine's canopy. In wet, humid climates poor air circulation can promote the development of various grape diseases such as powdery mildew and grey rot.

Components of a grapevine

While the term canopy is popularly used to describe the leafy foliage of the vine, the term actually refers to the entire grapevine structure that is above ground. This includes the trunk, cordon, stems, leaves, flowers, and fruit. Most vine training deals primarily with the "woody" structure of the vine-the cordons or "arms" of the vine that extend from the top of the trunk and the fruiting "canes" that extend from the cordon. When the canes are cut back nearly to the base of the cordon, the shortened stub is called a "spur". Grapevines can either be cane trained or spur trained. In cane training, the grapevines are "spur pruned" meaning that in the winter the fruiting canes are pruned essentially down to their spurs with over 90 percent of the previous year's growth (or "brush" as it is known) removed. Examples of cane training systems include the Guyot, Mosel arch and Pendelbogen. Conversely, spur trained vines are "cane pruned" meaning that the individual canes are relatively permanent with only excess buds at the end of the cane being removed.

Cordons are trained in either a unilateral (one arm) or bilateral (two arms) fashion with the latter resembling the letter "T". The cordons of grapevines are most commonly trained horizontally along wires as in the Lyre and Scott Henry systems. However, notable exceptions do exist, such as the "V" and "Y" trellis systems which elevate the cordon to various angles that resemble their namesake letter. Note that vertical trellising systems, such as the VSP system often used in New Zealand, refer to the vertical orientation of the fruit canes in an upward manner and not the cordon "arms" of the vines.

From the cordon, plant shoots emerge from the bud that eventually develops mature bark and becomes the fruiting cane from which grape clusters will emerge. These canes can be positioned and trained to whatever angle is desired by the grower. Typically, they are positioned upwards but they can be bent into an arch such as a Pendelbogen or Mosel arch system, or trained to point downwards such as the Scott Henry and Sylvos system. The latter method requires more labor-intensive trellising and training for Vitis vinifera vines which are naturally more inclined to grow upwards rather than down. In systems such as the Scott Henry, this downward growth is achieved by the use of movable wires that first allow the canes to grow upwards until about 2 to 3 weeks before harvest when they are then shifted downwards where the weight of gravity on the hanging grape clusters helps keep the canes pointing down.

The leafy foliage of a grapevine's canopy will be dependent on the particular grape variety and its propensity for vigorous growth. These leaves emerge from shoots on the fruiting cane in a manner similar to the grape clusters themselves. A vine is described as "vigorous" if it has a propensity to produce many shoots that are outwardly observable as a large, leafy canopy. The ability of the grapevine to support such a large canopy is dependent on the health of its root system and storage of carbohydrates. If a vine does not have a healthy and extensive root system in proportion to its canopy, then it is being overly vigorous with parts of the vine (most notably the grape clusters) suffering due to lack of resources. While it may seem that more foliage would promote increased photosynthesis (and such carbohydrate production), this is not always the case since the leaves near the top of the canopy create excess shading that hinders photosynthesis in the leaves below. One of the objectives of vine training is to create an "open canopy" that allows limited excess leaf growth and allows plenty of sunlight to penetrate the canopy.

Classification of different systems

Vine training systems can be broadly classified by a number of different measurements. One of the oldest means was based on the relative height of the trunk with the distance of the canopy from the ground being described as high-trained (also known as "high culture" or vignes hautes) or low-trained (vignes basses). The ancient Romans were adherents of the high-trained vine systems with the tendone system of vines trained high over head along a pergola being one example. In the 1950s, Austrian winemaker Lenz Moser advocated the high-culture style of training, recommending low density plantings of vines with trunks 4 ft (1.25 m) high. One of the benefits of a high-trained system is better frost protection versus low-trained systems such as the gobelet training system which tend to hang low to the ground. Some training systems such as the Guyot and cordons can be adapted to both high and low trained styles.

One of the most common manners of classifying vine training systems now is based on which parts of the vines are permanent fixtures which determines which parts of the vine are removed each year as part of the winter pruning. With a cane-trained system, there are no permanent cordons or branches that are kept year after year. The vine is pruned down to the spur in winter, leaving only one strong cane which is then trained into becoming the main branch for next year's crop. Examples of cane trained systems include the Guyot and Pendelbogen. With spur-trained systems, the main branch or cordon is kept each year with only individual canes being pruned during the winter. While vines that are cane trained will often have a thin, smooth main branch, spur trained vines will often have thick, dark and gnarled cordon branches. Many old vine vineyards will often utilize spur training system. Some examples of spur-training systems include the goblet or bush vine systems, and Cordon de Royat. Some systems, like the Scott Henry and VSP Trellis, can be adapted to both spur and cane training. Vine systems that are classified as either cane or spur trained may be alternately described by the way they are pruned in the winter so systems that are described as "cane-trained" will be spur pruned while systems that are "spur-trained" will be cane-pruned.

Within these larger classifications, the vine training system may be further distinguished by the canopy such as whether it is free (like goblet) or constrained by shoot positioning along wires (such as VSP trellising) and whether it includes a single curtain (Guyot) or double (Lyre). For cordon and many other spur trained systems, they could be described as unilateral (utilizing only 1 arm or cordon) or bilateral with both arms extending from the trunk. Two other classifications, based on trellising, are whether or not the vine is "staked" with an external support structure and the number of wires used in the trellising. Vines may be individual staked either permanently, as many vineyards along the bank of the Rhone Valley which are at risk of wind damage, or temporarily as some young vines are to provide extra support. Within a trellis system fruiting canes and young shoots are attached to wires strung out across the rows. The number of wires used (one, two, three) and whether or not they are movable (such as the Scott Henry) will influence the size of the canopy and the yield.

Common vine training systems

References

External links

Wine Doctor Vine Training Techniques with illustration of cane and spur pruning
Trellis and Training Systems - information from Cooperative Extension

Horticultural techniques
Vines
Viticulture